The Celtic pig is a breed of pig native to the autonomous community of Galicia in north-western Spain.

History 
Though they were relatively common until the early 20th century, Celtic pigs had nearly disappeared by 1980s. The breed is recovering and there are now more than 2 500 purebred sows.

Characteristics 
Celtic pigs grow more slowly and develop more fat than modern breeds like the Large White, making them less well-suited to intensive commercial meat production, but ideal for the creation of cured pork products.

Livestock census

References

External links
 http://www.porcocelta.info .
 Sistema Nacional de Información, Aplicación ARCA, Ministry of Agriculture, Food and Environment .
 Galician legislation ORDE do 27 de setembro de 2000 pola que se aproba a regulamentación específica do Libro Xenealóxico da Raza Porcina Celta DOG nº 205 .

Pig breeds
Pig breeds originating in Spain
Galicia (Spain)